Emil David Reutimann (born March 2, 1970) is an American professional stock car racing crew chief and former driver. A native of Zephyrhills, Florida, he has competed in the NASCAR Sprint Cup Series, NASCAR Nationwide Series, and Camping World Truck Series. In 2004, he won NASCAR Rookie of the Year honors in the Craftsman Truck Series. He is the son of Buzzie Reutimann.

He began his racing career in dirt-track modifieds and late models. In 1997, Reutimann moved into the NASCAR regional series before moving to the Busch Series in 2002. He moved up to the Sprint Cup Series in 2007, driving for Michael Waltrip Racing. Between the 2007 and 2011 Sprint Cup seasons, Reutimann recorded two wins, 26 top-tens, and four pole positions.

Personal life
Reutimann lives in Mooresville, North Carolina, with his wife Lisa and daughter Emilia. They are members of Berea Baptist Church in Mooresville.

Before he was a full-time race car driver, Reutimann worked briefly for the United Parcel Service, which in 2008 became his primary sponsor for the rest of that season.

Emilia is current a member of the Equestrian team for the South Carolina Gamecocks.

Early career

Reutimann, a third-generation racer, began his racing career in dirt-track modifieds and late models before moving up to the Slim Jim All Pro Series in 1997. He was named Rookie of the Year, finishing in the top-ten eight times and had a fifth-place points finish. The next season, he dropped to seventh in points, but received the Sportsmanship award at season's end. After several years, Reutimann got his first three wins in 2002 and finished second in the overall championship standings.

That same year, Reutimann made his Busch Series debut at Richmond International Raceway. Driving the No. 87 GEICO Chevrolet Monte Carlo for NEMCO Motorsports, Reutimann started thirty-fourth but finished sixteenth. He led twelve laps at his next race at Memphis Motorsports Park, and finished in the top-fifteen in each of his next two races. In 2003, Reutimann won a contest named "Hills Bros. Coffee Break of a Lifetime", a contest where Hills Bros. Coffee selected one driver to receive full sponsorship from them for 5 Busch Series races, and if that driver were to score three top 10s in those races, they'd receive a chance to start a Cup race. He ran those 5 races, along with 2 extra races, for NEMCO Motorsports. He finished fifth at Nashville Speedway USA and The Milwaukee Mile, as well as qualifying Greg Biffle's car on the pole at Memphis. He also attempted the New England 300 and the Brickyard 400 in the Winston Cup Series in the No. 04 for Morgan-McClure Motorsports, but failed to qualify both times.

In 2004, Reutimann signed on with Darrell Waltrip Motorsports to race the NTN Bearings truck in the Craftsman Truck Series. Winning the pole in his second race at Atlanta Motor Speedway, Reutimann had four top-fives and finished 14th in points, garnering Rookie of the Year honors. Reutimann won his first career race in 2005 at Nashville Superspeedway, and ended the season thirteenth in points. He also made his Cup debut at Lowe's Motor Speedway, driving the No. 00 State Fair Corn Dogs Chevrolet Monte Carlo for Michael Waltrip. He finished 22nd. He went winless in 2006, but had two poles and finished third in the championship standings. He also made fifteen Busch starts and had four top-tens.

Sprint Cup Series

2007

Reutimann moved up to the Nextel Cup Series in 2007 with Michael Waltrip Racing, and was a Raybestos Rookie of the Year Candidate.

Reutimann edged Kevin Lepage for a transfer spot during the Gatorade Duels into the Daytona 500. However, despite qualifying 14th, he was started from the rear of the field  because before the Duels, NASCAR penalized Waltrip's team including Reutimann's for illegal fuel additives in all MWR cars. At the same time the No. 00 car suffered an electrical problem during a wind-down lap. Reutimann ran in the top twenty of the Daytona 500 until he was collected in an accident on lap 173; he eventually finished 40th.

The following race, at Fontana, Reutimann was involved in a vicious crash. With 4 laps left in the race, Greg Biffle tapped his bumper, sending his car head-on into the wall. Upon impact, the car exploded in flames and slid backwards. The red flag flew, as Reutimann had instantly fallen unconscious. Paramedics came to the wreck, extinguished the flames, and helped a sore, dazed Reutimann out of his racecar. He was airlifted by a helicopter to a hospital. Reutimann suffered a minor concussion, a cracked rib and a few bruises; despite the injuries he returned to the track the next weekend in Mexico City for the Busch series. NASCAR said that Reutimann's accident tied with several other wrecks as the hardest crash in NASCAR history. This record stood until Elliott Sadler crashed at Pocono in 2010.

The next few weeks after were not very good for Reutimann and the 00 team, failing to qualify at Las Vegas, Bristol, and Texas. However, in the races he did make, he failed to make the top 30 until the tenth race of the season at Richmond, where he finished 28th. After having engine issues at Darlington and failing to qualify for the Coca-Cola 600 and the spring Dover race, along with a disappointing run at Pocono, Reutimann finished in the top 20 for the first time in his Cup career at Michigan, finishing 15th. Despite this, Reutimann was replaced for the races at Sonoma and Watkins Glen by road course ringer P. J. Jones in an attempt to get the #00 to the top 35 positions in owner points.

The rest of the season would end up repeating a cycle of bad finishes below 30th followed by a good finish above the top 20. After failing to qualify at Bristol, Atlanta, and Phoenix, Reutimann went on to finish the season 39th in points.

Late in the season, he won the 2007 Sam's Town 250 at Memphis Motorsports Park for his first career Busch Series win, and Toyota's second win in Busch Series competition. He finished second overall in the Busch Series' last season before becoming the Nationwide Series.

2008

In 2008, Reutimann ran the first five races of the season in the No. 00 Aaron's Dream Machine-sponsored car, before taking over for the retiring Dale Jarrett in the No. 44 UPS-sponsored car and handing the No. 00 car over to rookie Michael McDowell. Starting the season out with an 18th place in the Daytona 500, Reutimann started to show improvement over the last season. At Fontana the following week, he finished 23rd before getting 37th at Las Vegas a week later.

In his first two races in the No. 44 car, Reutimann had mechanical issues, having a suspension issue at Martinsville and getting a blown engine the following week at Texas.

Reutimann scored his first career top 10 at Lowe's Motor Speedway during the Coca-Cola 600 with a 10th-place finish. He also recorded top 10's at the Auto Club Speedway, Texas Motor Speedway, and the Richmond International Raceway. At the Richmond race in September, Reutimann led a race high 104 laps, but fell to 9th place. In the season finale at the Homestead-Miami Speedway, Reutimann claimed his first career pole position, becoming the 23rd driver to win poles in all three of NASCAR's top series.

2009
In 2009, Reutimann moved back to the No. 00 car. He competed a limited schedule in the Nationwide Series, splitting time with MWR's No. 99 Toyota Camry and Braun Racing's No. 10 Toyota Camry. During the Daytona 500, Reutimann finished 12th, which would be a new career high at the race. Two weeks later at Las Vegas, Reutimann would score his first top 5, finishing 5th in the race. At Texas, Reutimann would score his first pole of the season, finishing 11th in the race. A week later, at Phoenix, Reutimann would score his 2nd top 10 of the season.

On May 24, he qualified well in the Coca-Cola 600 but the race was delayed due to rain. The next day on lap 222 his crew chief Rodney Childers made a call to conserve fuel which put Reutimann in the lead. A few laps later on lap 227, a rain shower soaked the track for the second time of the race, red-flagging it with Reutimann in the lead. Reutimann spent a 1-hour wait praying and planning backup plans with boss Michael Waltrip and his pit crew. Despite blue skies being shown nearby the track, officials declared that the rain would last for the remainder of the night and called the race, thus giving Reutimann his first Cup series win in the Coca-Cola 600 and Waltrip giving him a full-time sponsorship until 2011.

With this emotional victory, Reutimann became the 20th driver to win a race in all three of NASCAR's top series (Cup, Nationwide, and Truck). This race was also the 50th Coca-Cola 600 at Lowes Motor Speedway. He also became the first driver in Cup history to win a race without leading a lap under green. In addition, he was the first driver to ever win with the No. 00 in the NASCAR Cup Series  This also entered Reutimann automatically into the 2010 NASCAR Sprint All-Star Race. 

A week after his victory, Reutimann would win his second pole of the season at Dover, finishing the race in 18th on the lead lap. The next week at Pocono, Reutimann would end up finishing 3rd, and would get another top 5 at Loudon a couple races after. Reutimann would end up getting five more top 10's at Indianapolis, Michigan, Atlanta, Kansas, and Phoenix. Reutimann would go on to finish the season 16th in the point standings, a personal best.

2010

Reutimann returned to the No. 00 car during the 2010 season. He would start the season with a personal best finish in the Daytona 500, finishing 5th. Reutimann won his second career race at the 2010 LifeLock.com 400 at Chicagoland Speedway in the No. 00 TUMS MWR Toyota. Reutimann ran in the top-five all night and with under seventy laps remaining, chased down Jeff Gordon and passed him for the lead. He would pull away and lead the rest of the race, holding off a late charge by Carl Edwards.

2011

2011 was a disappointing year for both Reutimann and MWR. Reutimann and the No. 00 team only scored one top five finish and two top ten finishes. At Watkins Glen on the final lap, Boris Said accidentally turned David Ragan entering the esses. Ragan came back onto the track and hit Reutimann, hit the ARMCO outside barrier and he rolled over spectacularly after the hard hit. He was mostly unscathed and Ragan dislocated his ankle as a result.

With three weeks remaining in the 2011 season, Reutimann could not come to an agreement with Aaron's for 2012 and thus Michael Waltrip and MWR's staff reluctantly released Reutimann from his team as well as the number 00.

After Christmas 2011, Reutimann signed up to drive for part-time with Stewart-Haas Racing and Tommy Baldwin Racing in 2012 sharing the No. 10 Go Daddy car with rookie Danica Patrick.

2012

On January 3, 2012, Reutimann signed a one-year contract to drive  for Tommy Baldwin Racing. As part of an alliance with Stewart-Haas Racing that TBR agreed to on January 31, Reutimann shared the SHR No. 10 entry, which was fielded by TBR, with Danica Patrick. He also drove the No. 92 RBR Enterprises vehicle in the Camping World Truck Series on a limited schedule. As Patrick drove the No. 10 in the 2012 Daytona 500, Reutimann drove the No. 93 Toyota Camry for BK Racing in the event with Todd Anderson serving as crew chief. Reutimann also drove the BK Racing No. 93 at Darlington.

Reutimann caused a controversy at the April Martinsville race when the No. 10 Tommy Baldwin Racing Chevrolet stalled on lap 497, drawing a caution. He was accused of intentionally causing the caution after limping around the track for a few laps at speeds well below the rest of the field. The result was a broken timing belt and Reutimann was credited with a 35th-place finish. He insists he was just trying to keep the car in the Top 35 in owner's points; the team left Martinsville just one point outside a guaranteed start. Reutimann qualified for the next race at Texas and finished 26th, getting the No. 10 back into the Top 35. During Coca-Cola 600 qualifying, David did not qualify fast enough in the No. 73 BK Racing entry and missed his first Cup race since 2007.

Reutimann drove the No. 51 Chevrolet for Phoenix Racing at the June Pocono race during the one-race suspension of Kurt Busch for actions detrimental to the sport. Baldwin explained his decision as helping another small team (Reutimann was to drive the No. 10 car that weekend). Reutimann finished 21st. Reutimann qualified and raced for a new team Xxxtreme Motorsports at the fall Phoenix race in the No. 44 No Label Watches Ford, finishing 40th.

2013

On January 18, 2013, BK Racing announced that Reutimann would drive the No. 83 Toyota during the 2013 season, replacing Landon Cassill.  Reutimann started the season a high note, finishing 16th in the Daytona 500.  However the team would struggle through the season, not recording another top-20 finish.  Reutimann finished 33rd in points. Following the season Reutimann and the team parted ways.

2014
Reutimann began the 2014 season without a ride in any of NASCAR's top three divisions, however in March it was announced that he would drive the Sprint Cup No. 35 Ford for Front Row Motorsports at Bristol Motor Speedway.  However, he failed to qualify for the event. Reutimann made the field in three of the six Cup races he attempted. It was the last time he ran a NASCAR-sanctioned race.

Post-NASCAR career
After ending his NASCAR career, Reutimann became a dirt track racing driver and chassis builder, founding Beak Built Chassis to develop UMP modified cars. In 2019, he joined Lee Faulk Racing as the crew chief for late model driver Ryan Rackley.

Motorsports career results

NASCAR
(key) (Bold – Pole position awarded by qualifying time. Italics – Pole position earned by points standings or practice time. * – Most laps led.)

Sprint Cup Series

Daytona 500

Nationwide Series

Camping World Truck Series

 Season still in progress
 Ineligible for series points

References

External links 
 
 

Living people
1970 births
People from Zephyrhills, Florida
Sportspeople from the Tampa Bay area
Racing drivers from Florida
NASCAR drivers
Michael Waltrip Racing drivers
USAC Silver Crown Series drivers